The 2010 Chicago Cubs season was the 139th season of the Chicago Cubs franchise, the 135th in the National League and the 95th at Wrigley Field. The Cubs finished fifth in the National League Central with a record of 75–87.

The Cubs played 10 extra inning games during the season, the fewest of any MLB team in 2010.

Off-season 
In December 2009, Florida Governor Charlie Crist met with Cubs president Crane Kenney, chairman Tom Ricketts and other team officials about possibly moving the Cubs' spring training and minor league facilities from Mesa to Naples.  In January 2010, however, the city of Mesa approved an agreement that would have the Cubs remain in that city for spring training through 2035, with the city building a new $84 million stadium and training facility.  The agreement would take effect pending financing legislation and subsequent voter referendum in November 2010.

2009 post-season changes

Trades

Free agent acquisitions

Players lost to free agency

Regular season

Midseason Trades

Season standings

Record vs. opponents

Game log 

|- bgcolor="ffbbbb"
|- align="center" bgcolor="ffbbbb"
| 1 || April 5 || @ Braves || 16–5 || Lowe (1–0) || Zambrano (0–1) ||  || 53,081 || 0–1
|- align="center" bgcolor="ffbbbb"
| 2 || April 7 || @ Braves || 3–2  || Moylan (1–0) || Grabow (0–1) || || 36,170 || 0–2
|- align="center" bgcolor="bbffbb"
| 3 || April 8 || @ Braves || 2–0 || Dempster (1–0) || Hanson (0–1) || Mármol (1) || 27,443 || 1–2
|- align="center" bgcolor="ffbbbb"
| 4 || April 9 || @ Reds || 5–4 || Owings (1–0) || Caridad (0–1) || || 24,419 || 1–3
|- align="center" bgcolor="bbffbb"
| 5 || April 10 || @ Reds || 4–3 || Zambrano (1–1) || Rhodes (0–1) || Mármol (2) || 27,235 || 2–3
|- align="center" bgcolor="ffbbbb"
| 6 || April 11 || @ Reds || 3–1 || Masset (1–0) || Grabow (0–2) || Cordero (2) || 25,168 || 2–4
|- align="center" bgcolor="bbffbb"
| 7 || April 13 || Brewers || 9–5 || Dempster (1–0) || Davis (0–1) || || 41,306 || 3–4
|- align="center" bgcolor="bbffbb"
| 8 || April 14 || Brewers || 7–6 || Gray (1–0) || Hawkins (0–1) || Mármol (3) || 39,565 || 4–4
|- align="center" bgcolor="ffbbbb"
| 9 || April 15 || Brewers || 8–6 || Narveson (1–0) || Samardzija (0–1) || Hoffman (3) || 38,026 || 4–5
|- align="center" bgcolor="bbffbb"
| 10 || April 16 || Astros || 7–2 || Silva (1–0) || Paulino (0–1) || || 37,291 || 5–5
|- align="center" bgcolor="ffbbbb"
| 11 || April 17 || Astros || 4–3 || Oswalt (1–2) || Gorzelanny (0–1) || Lindstrom (1) || 40,471 || 5–6
|- align="center" bgcolor="ffbbbb"
| 12 || April 18 || Astros || 3-2 (10) || Byrdak (1-0) || Marshall (0-1) || Lindstrom (2) || 39,506 || 5-7
|- align="center" bgcolor="ffbbbb"
| 13 || April 19 || @ Mets || 6–1 || Nieve (1–1) || Russell (0–1) || || 27,940 || 5–8
|- align="center" bgcolor="ffbbbb"
| 14 || April 20 || @ Mets || 4–0 || Pelfrey (3–0) || Zambrano (1–2) || || 27,502 || 5–9
|- align="center" bgcolor="bbffbb"
| 15 || April 21 || @ Mets || 9–3 || Silva (2–0) || Pérez (0–2) || || 25,684 || 6–9
|- align="center" bgcolor="ffbbbb"
| 16 || April 22 || @ Mets || 5–2 || Santana (2–1) || Gorzelanny (0–2) || Rodríguez (1) || 28,535 || 6–10
|- align="center" bgcolor="bbffbb"
| 17 || April 23 || @ Brewers || 8–1 || Dempster (2–0) || Suppan (0–1) || || 37,848 || 7–10
|- align="center" bgcolor="bbffbb"
| 18 || April 24 || @ Brewers || 5–1 || Lilly (1–0) || Davis (0–2) || || 43,410 || 8–10
|- align="center" bgcolor="bbffbb"
| 19 || April 25 || @ Brewers || 12–2 || Wells (2–0) || Bush (1–1) || || 38,364 || 9–10
|- align="center" bgcolor="bbffbb"
| 20 || April 26 || Nationals || 4-3 (10) || Mármol (1-0) || Bruney (1-1) || || 37,850 || 10-10
|- align="center" bgcolor="ffbbbb"
| 21 || April 27 || Nationals || 3-1 || Hernández (3-1) || Gorzelanny (0-3) || Capps (9) || 37,440 || 10-11
|- align="center" bgcolor="ffbbbb"
| 22 || April 28 || Nationals || 3-2 || Atilano (2-0) || Dempster (2-1)  || Capps (10) || 36,660 ||  10-12
|- align="center" bgcolor="ffbbbb"
| 23 || April 29 || Diamondbacks || 13-5 || Kennedy (1-1)  || Lilly (1-1) || || 36,850 || 10-13
|- align="center" bgcolor="bbffbb"
| 24 || April 30 || Diamondbacks || 11-5 || Wells (3-0)  || López (1-1) || || 37,800  || 11-13
|-

|- bgcolor="ffbbbb"
|- align="center" bgcolor="bbffbb"
| 25 || May 1 || Diamondbacks  || 7-5 || Marshall (1-1) || Gutierrez (0-3) || Mármol (4) || 40,368 || 12-13
|- align="center" bgcolor="bbffbb"
| 26 || May 2 || Diamondbacks || 10-5 || Gorzelanny (1-3) || Jackson (1-3)  || || 38,144 || 13-13
|- align="center" bgcolor="ffbbbb"
| 27 || May 4 || @ Pirates || 3-2 || Maholm (2-2) || Dempster (2-2) || Dotel (4) || 10,972 || 13-14
|- align="center" bgcolor="ffbbbb"
| 28 || May 5 || @ Pirates || 4-2 || Morton (1-5)  || Lilly (1-2) || Dotel (5) || 11,053 || 13-15
|- align="center" bgcolor="ffbbbb"
| 29 || May 6 || @ Pirates || 11-1 || Burres (2-1) || Wells (3-1) || || 11,085 || 13-16
|- align="center" bgcolor="bbffbb"
| 30 || May 7 || @ Reds || 14-7 || Silva (3-0) || Bailey (0-2) || || 20,030 || 14-16 
|- align="center" bgcolor="ffbbbb"
| 31 || May 8 || @ Reds || 14-2 || Harang (2-4) || Gorzelanny (1-4) || ||26,404 || 14-17
|- align="center" bgcolor="ffbbbb"
| 32 || May 9 || @ Reds || 5-3 || Leake (3-0) || Dempster (2-3) || Cordero (10) || 20,402 || 14-18
|- align="center" bgcolor="ffbbbb"
| 33 || May 10 || Marlins || 4-2 || Robertson (3-3) || Lilly (1-3) || Núñez (6) || 38,266 || 14-19 
|- align="center" bgcolor="ffbbbb"
| 34 || May 11 || Marlins || 3-2 || Nolasco (3-2) || Wells (3-2) || Núñez (7) || 38,007 || 14-20
|- align="center" bgcolor="bbffbb"
| 35 || May 12 || Marlins || 4-3 || Silva (4-0) || Volstad (3-3) || Mármol (5) || 38,637 || 15-20
|- align="center" bgcolor="ffbbbb"
| 36 || May 14 || Pirates || 10-6 || Meek (2-1) || Zambrano (1-3) || || 39,082 || 15-21
|- align="center" bgcolor="ffbbbb"
| 37 || May 15 || Pirates || 4-3 || Maholm (3-3) || Dempster (2-4) || Dotel (7) || 41,336 || 15-22 
|- align="center" bgcolor="bbffbb"
| 38 || May 16 || Pirates || 4-3 || Marshall (2-1) || Carrasco (1-1) || Mármol (6) || 40,636 || 16-22
|- align="center" bgcolor="bbffbb"
| 39 || May 17 || Rockies || 4-2 (11) || Marshall (3-1) || Belisle (1-1) || || 35,760 || 17-22
|- align="center" bgcolor="bbffbb"
| 40 || May 18 || Rockies || 6-2 || Silva (5-0) || Chacin (2-2) || || 37,029 ||  18-22
|- align="center" bgcolor="bbffbb"
| 41 || May 19 || @ Phillies || 4-1 || Gorzelanny (2-4) || Moyer (2-4) || Mármol (7) || 45,140 || 19-22
|- align="center" bgcolor="ffbbbb"
| 42 || May 20 || @ Phillies || 5-4 || Báez (2-1) || Grabow (0-3) || Contreras (2) || 45,325 || 19-23
|- align="center" bgcolor="ffbbbb"
| 43 || May 21 || @ Rangers || 2-1 || Lewis(4-2)  || Lilly (1-4)  || Feliz (12) || 38,943 || 19-24
|- align="center" bgcolor="bbffbb"
| 44 || May 22 || @ Rangers || 5-4 (10) || Marshall (4-1) || O'day (1-2) || Mármol (8) || 46,180 || 20-24
|- align="center" bgcolor="bbffbb"
| 45 || May 23 || @ Rangers || 5-4 || Silva (6-0) || Wilson (3-2) || Mármol (9) || 37,777 || 21-24
|- align="center" bgcolor="bbffbb"
| 46 || May 25 || Dodgers || 3-0 || Dempster (3-4) || Kershaw (4-3) || Mármol (10) || 34,749 || 22-24
|- align="center" bgcolor="ffbbbb"
| 47 || May 26 || Dodgers || 8-5 || Billingsley (6-2) || Gorzelanny (2-5) || Broxton (11) || 35,828 || 22-25
|- align="center" bgcolor="bbffbb"
| 48 || May 27 || Dodgers || 1-0 || Marshall (5-1) || Ely (3-2) || Mármol (11) || 33,868 || 23-25
|- align="center" bgcolor="ffbbbb"
| 49 || May 28 || Cardinals || 7-1  || Carpenter (6-1) || Wells (3-3) || || 39,536 || 23-26
|- align="center" bgcolor="bbffbb"
| 50 || May 29 || Cardinals || 5-0 || Silva (7-0)  || Ottavino (0-1) || || 40,601 || 24-26 
|- align="center" bgcolor="ffbbbb"
| 51 || May 30 || Cardinals || 9-1 || Wainwright (7-3) || Dempster (3-5) || || 41,353 || 24-27
|- align="center" bgcolor="ffbbbb"
| 52 || May 31 || @ Pirates || 2-1 || Meek (3-1) || Marshall (5-2) || Dotel (11) || 20,235 || 24-28 
|-

|- bgcolor="ffbbbb"
|- align="center" bgcolor="ffbbbb"
| 53 || June 1 || @ Pirates || 3-2 || Hanrahan (2-1) || Lilly (1-5) || Dotel (12) || 11,334 || 24-29 
|- align="center" bgcolor="bbbbbb"
| – || June 2 || @ Pirates || colspan=6 |Postponed (rain); rescheduled for June 7
|- align="center" bgcolor="ffbbbb"
| 54 || June 4 || @ Astros || 3-1  || Paulino (1-7) || Zambrano (1-4) || Lindstrom (12) || 28,784 || 24-30
|- align="center" bgcolor="bbffbb"
| 55 || June 5 || @ Astros || 8-5 || Dempster (4-5) || Oswalt (3-8) || Mármol (12) || 34,241 || 25-30 
|- align="center" bgcolor="ffbbbb"
| 56 || June 6 || @ Astros || 6-3 || Myers (4-3) || Wells (3-4) || Lindstrom (13) || 29,493 || 25-31 
|- align="center" bgcolor="bbffbb"
| 57 || June 7 || @ Pirates || 6-1 || Silva (8-0)  || Eveland (3-5) || Marshall (1) || 12,768 || 26-31 
|- align="center" bgcolor="ffbbbb"
| 58 || June 8 || @ Brewers || 3-2 || Axford (2-1) || Mármol (1-1) || || 30,082|| 26-32 
|- align="center" bgcolor="bbffbb"
| 59 || June 9 || @ Brewers || 9-4  || Zambrano (2-4) || Wolf (4-6) ||  || 30,326  || 27-32 
|- align="center" bgcolor="ffbbbb"
| 60 || June 10 || @ Brewers || 5-4 (10) || Axford (3-1) || Howry (1-1) ||  || 36,363 || 27-33 
|- align="center" bgcolor="ffbbbb"
| 61 || June 11 || White Sox || 10-5 || Peavy (5-5) || Wells (3-5) ||  || 41,129 || 27-34 
|- align="center" bgcolor="ffbbbb"
| 62 || June 12 || White Sox || 2-1 || Buehrle (4-6) || Silva (8-1) || Jenks (11) || 40,397 || 27-35
|- align="center" bgcolor="bbffbb"
| 63 || June 13 || White Sox || 1-0 || Lilly (2-5) || Floyd (2-7) || Mármol (13)  || 40,456 ||28-35 
|- align="center" bgcolor="ffbbbb"
| 64 || June 15 || Athletics || 9-5 || Cahill (6-2) || Zambrano (2-5) ||  || 34,390 || 28-36
|- align="center" bgcolor="bbffbb"
| 65 || June 16 || Athletics || 6-2 || Dempster (5-5) || Gonzalez (6-5) || || 36,244 || 29-36
|- align="center" bgcolor="bbffbb"
| 66 || June 17 || Athletics || 3-2 || Mármol (2-1) || Blevins (2-1) || || 36,942 || 30-36
|- align="center" bgcolor="ffbbbb"
| 67 || June 18 || Angels || 7-6 || Kazmir (7-5) || Silva (8-2) || Rodney (6) || 39,729 || 30-37 
|- align="center" bgcolor="ffbbbb"
| 68 || June 19 || Angels || 12-0 || Weaver (7-3) || Lilly (2-6) || || 40,008 || 30-38  
|- align="center" bgcolor="bbffbb"
| 69 || June 20 || Angels || 12-1 || Zambrano (3-5) || Saunders (5-8) || || 39,850 || 31-38
|- align="center" bgcolor="ffbbbb"
| 70 || June 22 || @ Mariners || 2-0 || Vargas (6-2) || Dempster (5-6) || Aardsma (16) || 27,975 || 31-39
|- align="center" bgcolor="ffbbbb"
| 71 || June 23 || @ Mariners || 8-1 || Lee (6-3) || Wells (3-6) || || 31,394 || 31-40 
|- align="center" bgcolor="bbffbb"
| 72 || June 24 || @ Mariners || 3-2 (13) || Grabow (1-3)  || Olson (0-2) || Gorzelanny (1) || 41,329 || 32-40
|- align="center" bgcolor="ffbbbb"
| 73 || June 25 || @ White Sox || 6-0 || Peavy (7-5) || Zambrano (3-6) || || 39,364 || 32-41
|- align="center" bgcolor="ffbbbb"
| 74 || June 26 || @ White Sox || 3-2 || Putz (4-2) || Cashner (0-1) || Thornton (3)  || 39,479  || 32-42
|- align="center" bgcolor="bbffbb"
| 75 || June 27 || @ White Sox || 8-6 || Dempster (6-6) || Danks (7-6) || || 39,682 || 33-42
|- align="center" bgcolor="ffbbbb"
| 76 || June 28 || Pirates || 2-1 || Maholm (5-6) || Cashner (0-2) || Dotel (15) || 38,512 || 33-43
|- align="center" bgcolor="bbffbb"
| 77 || June 29 || Pirates || 3-1 || Lilly (3-6) || Karstens (2-3) || Mármol (14) || 36,914 || 34-43 
|- align="center" bgcolor="ffbbbb"
| 78 || June 30 || Pirates || 2-0 || Lincoln (1-2) || Cashner (0-3) || Dotel (16) || 37,391 || 34-44
|-

|- bgcolor="ffbbbb"
|- align="center" bgcolor="ffbbbb"
| 79 || July 1 || Reds || 3-2 || Smith (1-0) || Howry (1-2) || Cordero (22) || 36,880 || 34-45
|- align="center" bgcolor="ffbbbb"
| 80 || July 2 || Reds || 12-0 || Arroyo (8-4) || Dempster (6-7) || || 40,361 || 34-46 
|- align="center" bgcolor="bbffbb"
| 81 || July 3 || Reds || 3-1 || Wells (4-6) || Smith (1-1) || Mármol (15) || 40,677 || 35-46
|- align="center" bgcolor="ffbbbb"
| 82 || July 4 || Reds || 14-3 || Leake (6-1) || Lilly (3-7) || || 41,079  ||  35-47
|- align="center" bgcolor="bbffbb"
| 83 || July 5 || @ Diamondbacks || 9-4 || Gorzelanny (3-5) || Kennedy (3-7) || || 26,250 || 36-47
|- align="center" bgcolor="bbffbb"
| 84 || July 6 || @ Diamondbacks || 6-4 || Silva (9-2) || Enright (1-1) || Mármol (16) || 20,067 ||  37-47
|- align="center" bgcolor="bbffbb"
| 85 || July 7 || @ Diamondbacks || 8-3 || Dempster (7-7) || Jackson (6-7) || || 20,914 || 38-47
|- align="center" bgcolor="ffbbbb"
| 86 || July 8 || @ Dodgers || 3-2 || Kershaw 9-4 || Wells (4-7) || Broxton (19) || 43,640 || 38-48 
|- align="center" bgcolor="ffbbbb"
| 87 || July 9 || @ Dodgers || 9-7 || Billingsley (7-4) || Lilly (3-8) || || 43,790 || 38-49  
|- align="center" bgcolor="bbffbb"
| 88 || July 10 || @ Dodgers || 7-3 || Gorzelanny (4-5) || Ely (4-7) || || 49,016 || 39-49
|- align="center" bgcolor="ffbbbb"
| 89 || July 11 || @ Dodgers || 7-0 || Padilla (4-2) || Silva (9-3) || || 45,398 || 39-50
|- align="center" bgcolor="bbffbb"
| 90 || July 15 || Phillies || 12-6 || Dempster (8-7) || Moyer (9-9) || || 40,879 || 40-50
|- align="center" bgcolor="bbffbb"
| 91 || July 16 || Phillies || 4-3 || Marshall (6-2) || Madson (2-1) || Mármol (17) || 40,622 || 41-50
|- align="center" bgcolor="ffbbbb"
| 92 || July 17 || Phillies || 4-1 || Durbin (1-1) || Mármol (2-2) || Lidge (7) || 40,924 || 41-51
|- align="center" bgcolor="bbffbb"
| 93 || July 18 || Phillies || 11-6 || Gorzelanny (5-5) || Halladay (10-8) || || 39,333 || 42-51
|- align="center" bgcolor="ffbbbb"
| 94 || July 19 || Astros || 11-5 || Rodríguez (7-11) || Silva (9-4) || || 35,514 || 42-52
|- align="center" bgcolor="bbffbb"
| 95 || July 20 || Astros || 14-7 || Cashner (1-3) || Lyon (5-4) || || 36,401 || 43-52
|- align="center" bgcolor="ffbbbb"
| 96 || July 21 || Astros || 4-3 (12) || Lyon (6-4) || Howry (1-3) || Chacin (1) || 38,533 || 43-53
|- align="center" bgcolor="bbffbb"
| 97 || July 23 || Cardinals || 5-0 || Wells (5-7) || Suppan (0-6) || || 40,687 || 44-53
|- align="center" bgcolor="bbffbb"
| 98 || July 24 || Cardinals || 6-5 || Gorzelanny (6-5) || Hawksworth (4-6) || Mármol (18) || 41,009 || 45-53
|- align="center" bgcolor="ffbbbb"
| 99 || July 25 || Cardinals || 4-3 (11) || Franklin (5-1) || Schlitter (0-1) || Reyes (1) || 41,406 || 45-54
|- align="center" bgcolor="bbffbb"
| 100 || July 26 || @ Astros || 5-2 || Silva (10-4) || Wright (0-1) || Mármol (19) || 25,037 || 46-54
|- align="center" bgcolor="ffbbbb"
| 101 || July 27 || @ Astros || 6-1 || Myers (8-6) || Cashner (1-4) || || 28,047 || 46-55
|- align="center" bgcolor="ffbbbb"
| 102 || July 28 || @ Astros || 8-1 || Norris (3-7) || Wells (5-8) || || 28,046 || 46-56
|- align="center" bgcolor="ffbbbb"
| 103 || July 30 || @ Rockies || 17-2 || Francis (4-3) || Dempster (8-8) || || 40,189 || 46-57
|- align="center" bgcolor="ffbbbb"
| 104 || July 31 || @ Rockies || 6-5 || Street (2-2) || Marshall (6-3) || || 48,065 || 46-58
|-

|- bgcolor="ffbbbb"
|- align="center" bgcolor="ffbbbb"
| 105 || August 1 || @ Rockies || 8-7 || de la Rosa (4-3) || Silva (10-5) || || 38,256 || 46-59
|- align="center" bgcolor="ffbbbb"
| 106 || August 2 || Brewers || 18-1 || Gallardo (10-5) || Wells (5-9) || || 37,731 || 46-60
|- align="center" bgcolor="ffbbbb"
| 107 || August 3 || Brewers || 4-3 || Narveson (9-7) || Diamond (0-1) || Axford (16) || 36,183 || 46-61
|- align="center" bgcolor="bbffbb"
| 108 || August 4 || Brewers || 15-3 || Dempster (9-8) || Parra (3-9) || || 38,425 || 47-61
|- align="center" bgcolor="ffbbbb"
| 109 || August 6 || Reds || 3-0 || Arroyo (12-6) || Gorzelanny (6-6) || Cordero (30) || 40,696 || 47-62
|- align="center" bgcolor="ffbbbb"
| 110 || August 7 || Reds || 4-3 || Ondrusek (3-0) || Wells (5-10) || Masset (2) || 41,227 || 47-63
|- align="center" bgcolor="ffbbbb"
| 111 || August 8 || Reds || 11-4 || Wood (3-1) || Diamond (0-2) || || 39,016 || 47-64
|- align="center" bgcolor="ffbbbb"
| 112 || August 9 || @ Giants || 4-3 (11) || Ray (5-0) || Mateo (0-1) || || 41,943 || 47-65
|- align="center" bgcolor="bbffbb"
| 113 || August 10 || @ Giants || 8-6 || Dempster (10-8) || Lincecum (11-6) || || 35,389 || 48-65
|- align="center" bgcolor="ffbbbb"
| 114 || August 11 || @ Giants || 5-4 || Romo (5-3) || Berg (0-1) || Wilson (33) || 36,139 || 48-66
|- align="center" bgcolor="ffbbbb"
| 115 || August 12 || @ Giants || 8-7 || Wilson (3-1) || Cashner (1-5) || || 40,872 || 48-67
|- align="center" bgcolor="ffbbbb"
| 116 || August 13 || @ Cardinals || 6-3 || Westbrook (7-7) || Diamond (0-3) || Franklin (21) || 45,546 || 48-68
|- align="center" bgcolor="bbffbb"
| 117 || August 14 || @ Cardinals || 3-2 || Zambrano (4-6) || Carpenter (13-4) || Mármol (20) || 46,313 || 49-68
|- align="center" bgcolor="bbffbb"
| 118 || August 15 || @ Cardinals || 9-7 || Dempster (11-8) || Lohse (1-5) || Mármol (21) || 44,074 || 50-68
|- align="center" bgcolor="ffbbbb"
| 119 || August 16 || Padres || 9-5 || Correia (10-7) || Gorzelanny (6-7) || || 36,814 || 50-69
|- align="center" bgcolor="ffbbbb"
| 120 || August 17 || Padres || 1-0 || Garland (12-8) || Wells (5-11) || Bell (36) || 33,664 || 50-70
|- align="center" bgcolor="ffbbbb"
| 121 || August 18 || Padres || 5-1 || Richard (11-5) || Coleman (0-1) || || 33,267 || 50-71
|- align="center" bgcolor="ffbbbb"
| 122 || August 19 || Padres || 5-3 || Latos (13-5) || Marshall (6-4) || Bell (37) || 30,687 || 50-72 
|- align="center" bgcolor="ffbbbb"
| 123 || August 20 || Braves || 5-3 || Moylan (5-2) || Mármol (2-3) || Wagner (30) || 39,345 || 50-73
|- align="center" bgcolor="bbffbb"
| 124 || August 21 || Braves || 5-4 || Gorzelanny (7-7) || Hanson (8-9) || Mármol (22) || 41,099 || 51-73
|- align="center" bgcolor="ffbbbb"
| 125 || August 22 || Braves || 16-5 || Minor (2-0) || Wells (5-12) || || 37,518 || 51-74
|- align="center" bgcolor="bbffbb"
| 126 || August 23 || @ Nationals || 9-1 || Coleman (1-1) || Hernández (8-9) || || 17,921 || 52-74
|- align="center" bgcolor="bbffbb"
| 127 || August 24 || @ Nationals || 5-4 || Zambrano (5-6) || Lannan (5-6) || Mármol (23) || 18,250 || 53-74
|- align="center" bgcolor="bbffbb"
| 128 || August 25 || @ Nationals || 4-0 || Dempster (12-8) || Marquis (0-7) || Mármol (24) || 18,344 || 54-74
|- align="center" bgcolor="ffbbbb"
| 129 || August 27 || @ Reds || 7-1 || Cueto (12-4) || Gorzelanny (7-8) || || 36,219 || 54-75
|- align="center" bgcolor="bbffbb"
| 130 || August 28 || @ Reds || 3-2 || Wells (6-12) || Arroyo (14-8) || Mármol (24) || 41,292 || 55-75 
|- align="center" bgcolor="ffbbbb"
| 131 || August 29 || @ Reds || 7-5 || Ondrusek (4-0) || Marshall (6-5) || Cordero (35) || 30,809 || 55-76
|- align="center" bgcolor="bbffbb"
| 132 || August 30 || Pirates || 14-2 || Zambrano (6-6) || Maholm (7-13) || || 29,538 || 56-76
|- align="center" bgcolor="ffbbbb"
| 133 || August 31 || Pirates || 14-7 || Karstens (3-10) || Dempster (12-9) || || 31,369 || 56-77
|-

|- bgcolor="ffbbbb"
|- align="center" bgcolor="bbffbb"
| 134 || September 1 || Pirates || 5-3 || Diamond (1-3) || McDonald (2-5) || Mármol (25) || 33,555 || 57-77
|- align="center" bgcolor="bbffbb"
| 135 || September 3 || Mets || 7-6 || Russell (1-1) || Dickey (9-6) || Mármol (26) || 31,424 || 58-77
|- align="center" bgcolor="bbffbb"
| 136 || September 4 || Mets || 5-3 || Zambrano (7-6) || Mejia (0-3) || Mármol (27) || 39,473 || 59-77
|- align="center" bgcolor="ffbbbb"
| 137 || September 5 || Mets || 18-5 || Niese (9-7) || Dempster (12-10) || || 40,788 || 59-78
|- align="center" bgcolor="bbffbb"
| 138 || September 6 || Astros || 5-4 || Cashner (2-5) || López (5-2) || Mármol (28) || 31,647 || 60-78
|- align="center" bgcolor="ffbbbb"
| 139 || September 7 || Astros || 7-3 || Figueroa (5-2) || Silva (10-6) || || 31,596 || 60-79
|- align="center" bgcolor="ffbbbb"
| 140 || September 8 || Astros || 4-0 || Myers (11-7) || Wells (6-13) || || 33,623 || 60-80
|- align="center" bgcolor="bbffbb"
| 141 || September 10 || @ Brewers || 4-0 || Zambrano (8-6) || Bush (7-12) || Mármol (29) || 30,975 || 61-80
|- align="center" bgcolor="bbffbb"
| 142 || September 11 || @ Brewers || 1-0 || Dempster (13-10) || Wolf (11-11) || Mármol (30) || 41,463 || 62-80
|- align="center" bgcolor="ffbbbb"
| 143 || September 12 || @ Brewers || 2-0 || Gallardo (12-7) || Coleman (1-2) || Axford (21) || 37,317 || 62-81
|- align="center" bgcolor="bbffbb"
| 144 || September 13 || @ Cardinals || 5-1 || Samardzija (1-1) || García (13-8) || || 40,720 || 63-81
|- align="center" bgcolor="bbffbb"
| 145 || September 14 || @ Cardinals || 7-2 || Wells (7-13) || Wainwright (18-11) || || 40,509 || 64-81
|- align="center" bgcolor="bbffbb"
| 146 || September 15 || @ Cardinals || 7-3 || Zambrano (9-6) || Carpenter (15-7) || Mármol (31) || 41,145 || 65-81
|- align="center" bgcolor="bbffbb"
| 147 || September 17 || @ Marlins || 2-0 || Dempster (14-10) || Sanabia (4-3) || Mármol (32) || 22,751 || 66-81
|- align="center" bgcolor="bbffbb"
| 148 || September 18 || @ Marlins || 5-3 || Coleman (2-2) || Sánchez (12-10) || Mármol (33) || 28,716 || 67-81
|- align="center" bgcolor="bbffbb"
| 149 || September 19 || @ Marlins || 13-3 || Samardzija (2-1) || Miller (1-3) || || 20,203 || 68-81
|- align="center" bgcolor="ffbbbb"
| 150 || September 21 || Giants || 1-0 || Ramírez (1-3) || Cashner (2-6) || Wilson (44) || 36,364 || 68-82
|- align="center" bgcolor="bbffbb"
| 151 || September 22 || Giants || 2-0 || Wells (8-13) || Sánchez (11-9) || Mármol (34) || 37,285 || 69-82
|- align="center" bgcolor="ffbbbb"
| 152 || September 23 || Giants || 13-0 || Bumgarner (6-6) || Dempster (14-11) || || 34,481 || 69-83
|- align="center" bgcolor="ffbbbb"
| 153 || September 24 || Cardinals || 7-1 || Wainwright (20-11) || Gorzelanny (7-9) || || 36,553 || 69-84
|- align="center" bgcolor="bbffbb"
| 154 || September 25 || Cardinals || 7-3 || Coleman (3-2) || Carpenter (15-9) || || 39,316 || 70-84
|- align="center" bgcolor="ffbbbb"
| 155 || September 26 || Cardinals || 8-7 || Westbrook (9-11) || Samardzija (2-2) || Franklin (26) || 38,057 || 70-85
|- align="center" bgcolor="bbffbb"
| 156 || September 27 || @ Padres || 1-0 || Zambrano (10-6) || Stauffer (5-5) || Mármol (35) || 22,739 || 71-85
|- align="center" bgcolor="bbffbb"
| 157 || September 28 || @ Padres || 5-2 || Dempster (15-11) || Laots (14-9) || Mármol (36) || 27,619 || 72-85
|- align="center" bgcolor="ffbbbb"
| 158 || September 29 || @ Padres || 3-0 || Young (2-0) || Wells (8-14) || Bell (45) || 29,400 || 72-86
|- align="center" bgcolor="bbffbb"
| 159 || September 30 || @ Padres || 1-0 || Marshall (7-5) || Bell (6-1) || Mármol (37) || 28,576 || 73-86
|-

|- bgcolor="ffbbbb"
|- align="center" bgcolor="bbffbb"
| 160 || October 1 || @ Astros || 2-0 || Coleman (4-2) || Norris (9-10) || Mármol (38) || 33,869 || 74-86
|- align="center" bgcolor="bbffbb"
| 161 || October 2 || @ Astros || 8-3 || Zambrano (11-6) || Happ (6-4) || || 36,098 || 75-86
|- align="center" bgcolor="ffbbbb"
| 162 || October 3 || @ Astros || 4-0 || Figueroa (7-4) || Dempster (15-12) || || 31,105 || 75-87
|-

Roster

Player stats

Batting

Starters by position 
Note: Pos = Position; G = Games played; AB = At bats; R = Runs scored; H = Hits; 2B = Doubles; 3B = Triples; HR = Home runs; Avg. = Batting average; RBI = Runs batted in; SB = Stolen bases

Pitchers batting 
Note: Pos = Position; G = Games played; AB = At bats; R = Runs scored; H = Hits; 2B = Doubles; 3B = Triples; HR = Home runs; Avg. = Batting average; RBI = Runs batted in; SB = Stolen bases

Note: All pitchers who batted during the season is noted above.

Pitching

Starting and other pitchers 
Note: W = Wins; L = Losses; ERA = Earned run average; G = Games pitched; GS = Games started; SV = Saves; IP = Innings pitched; H = Hits allowed; R = Runs allowed; ER = Earned runs allowed; BB = Walks allowed; K = Strikeouts

Relief pitchers 
Note: W = Wins; L = Losses; ERA = Earned run average; G = Games pitched; GS = Games started; SV = Saves; IP = Innings pitched; H = Hits allowed; R = Runs allowed; ER = Earned runs allowed; BB = Walks allowed; K = Strikeouts

Farm system

References

External links 

 2010 Chicago Cubs season at Baseball Reference
 2010 Chicago Cubs season Official Site

Chicago Cubs seasons
Chicago Cubs
Cub